Givanildo Pulgas da Silva (born 3 January 1993), commonly known as Giva, is a Brazilian professional footballer who plays as a forward for Indonesian club Persik Kediri.

Club career

Santos
Born in Cachoeira, Espírito Santo, Giva joined Santos FC's youth system in May 2012, after starting it out at EC Vitória. He progressed through the youth categories, and won 2013 Copa São Paulo de Futebol Júnior, being the club topscorer along with Neílton (4 goals each).

On 24 February 2013, Giva made his first team debut in a Campeonato Paulista game against XV de Piracicaba. On 21 March he scored his first professional goals, netting a brace in a 2–1 home win against Mirassol FC.

On 7 July, Giva made his Série A debut, starting and scoring the first of a 2–0 victory over São Paulo. Despite appearing regularly in 2013, he was rarely used in 2014.

Coritiba
On 30 December 2014, Giva signed for fellow league team Coritiba. He made his debut for the club on 31 January of the following year, coming on as a substitute in a 2–1 Campeonato Paranaense away win against Nacional.

Giva scored his first goal for the club on 27 May, netting the last in a 2–1 Copa do Brasil home win against Ponte Preta. He was released on 4 August, after making no league appearances for Coxa.

Llagostera
On 14 August 2015 Giva signed a two-year deal with Spanish Segunda División side UE Llagostera. On 18 January of the following year, after contributing with two goals in 11 games, he rescinded his link.

Náutico
On 2 January 2017 Giva signed with Náutico

Badalona
After five months at CF Badalona, Giva left the club by mutual agreement on 1 February 2019. The player had asked to leave the club due to personal reasons.

Career statistics

Honours
Santos
Copa São Paulo de Futebol Júnior: 2013

References

External links

1993 births
Living people
Brazilian footballers
Association football forwards
Campeonato Brasileiro Série A players
Campeonato Brasileiro Série C players
Campeonato Brasileiro Série D players
Santos FC players
Coritiba Foot Ball Club players
Associação Atlética Ponte Preta players
Goiânia Esporte Clube players
Sociedade Imperatriz de Desportos players
Figueirense FC players
Segunda División players
Segunda División B players
UE Costa Brava players
CF Badalona players
Brazilian expatriate footballers
Brazilian expatriate sportspeople in Spain
Expatriate footballers in Spain